is a Japanese cyclist who competes in both cyclo-cross and road cycling. He won the Japanese national cyclo-cross championship five times in a row from 2011 to 2015. He represented his nation in the men's elite event at the 2016 UCI Cyclo-cross World Championships  in Heusden-Zolder. In 2015, he was a member of the Belgian team .

Major results

Cyclo-cross

2006–2007
 2nd National Under-23 Championships
2010–2011
 2nd National Championships
2011–2012
 1st  National Championships
 1st Shinshu Cyclocross Nobeyama Kogen
 2nd Yasu
2012–2013
 1st  National Championships
 1st Shinshu Cyclocross Nobeyama Kogen
 1st Yasu
2013–2014
 1st  National Championships
 1st Shinshu Cyclocross Nobeyama Kogen Round 1
 1st Shinshu Cyclocross Nobeyama Kogen Round 2
 1st Yasu
2014–2015
 1st  National Championships
2015–2016
 1st  National Championships
 1st Rapha Nobeyama Supercross
2017–2018
 3rd Rapha Supercross Nobeyama Day 1
2019–2020
 2nd National Championships
2021–2022
 3rd National Championships

Road
2012
 8th Grand Prix de la ville de Pérenchies
2013
 8th Grand Prix Criquielion

References

External links
 

1988 births
Living people
Cyclo-cross cyclists
Japanese male cyclists
Place of birth missing (living people)
Sportspeople from Saitama (city)